Nizhneudinsk Airport (Russian: Аэропорт «Нижнеудинск»)  regional airport, is located on the south-east of Nizhneudinsk in the Irkutsk Oblast.

Passenger

References 

Airports in Irkutsk Oblast